Alexander Ronald Moore (21 December 1917 – 28 August 1989) was an Australian rules footballer who played for the Collingwood Football Club in the Victorian Football League (VFL).

Family
The son of Alexander John Moore, and Veronica Sophia Moore, née Long, Alexander Ronald Moore was born at Collingwood, Victoria on 21 December 1917.

He married Alva Lillian Rosewarne in 1943.

Military service
Moore served in the Australian Army for three years during World War II, being discharged just before he played his two senior games for Collingwood in 1943.

Death
He died at Hampton, Victoria on 28 August 1989.

Notes

References

External links 

 
 
 Profile at Collingwood Forever.

1917 births
1989 deaths
Australian rules footballers from Melbourne
Collingwood Football Club players
People from Collingwood, Victoria
Australian Army personnel of World War II
Military personnel from Melbourne